Palmere may refer to:

Palmoli, also known as Palmere
Ricardus de Palmere, English MP